Bodil Malmsten (19 August 1944 – 5 February 2016) was a Swedish poet and novelist.

Malmsten was born in Bjärme, Östersund Municipality. Due to her parents' early separation, she grew up at her maternal grandparents and at foster care in Vällingby, Stockholm. Her paternal grandfather was designer and architect Carl Malmsten. She debuted as author in 1970 together with Peter Csihas (1945–2011) with their children's book Ludvig åker. Csihas and Malmsten had a relationship during the 1960s and 70s and have a daughter, Stefania, born 1967, who is designer and actor.

The English translation of her novel, Priset på vatten i Finistère (The Price of Water in Finistère, translated by Frank Perry), was selected as a Book of the Week on BBC Radio 4.  In the novel, having decided to pack up and leave her country of birth, she recounts the story her settling into her new home in the Finistère département, in Brittany. It is told in a series of vignettes about gardening, learning the language, dealing with French bureaucracy, and struggling with writer's block.

She was awarded a doctorate honoris causa ad gradum (honorary degree) by the Faculty of Human Sciences at the Mid-Sweden University in Östersund in 2006.

Malmsten died of cancer at her home in Stockholm on 5 February 2016, aged 71.

Published works
Dvärgen Gustaf (1977) 
Damen, det brinner! (1984) 
Paddan & branden (1987) 
B-ställningar (1987) 
Svartvita bilder (1988)  
Nåd & onåd Idioternas bok (1989) 
Nefertiti i Berlin (1990) 
Landet utan lov (1991) 
Det är ingen ordning på mina papper (1991) 
Inte med den eld jag har nu : dikt för annan dam (1993) 
Den dagen kastanjerna slår ut är jag långt härifrån (1994) 
Nästa som rör mig (1996)  — The next one who touches me
Undergångarens sånger (1998) 
Priset på vatten i Finistère (2001)  (published in English as The Price of Water in Finistère )
Det är fortfarande ingen ordning på mina papper (2003) 
 Kom och hälsa på mig om tusen år (2007) 
Det här är hjärtat (2015)

References

Further reading

External links

1944 births
2016 deaths
People from Östersund Municipality
Writers from Jämtland
Swedish-language poets
Litteris et Artibus recipients
Swedish women poets
Swedish women novelists
20th-century Swedish novelists
20th-century Swedish poets
21st-century Swedish novelists
21st-century Swedish poets
20th-century Swedish women writers
21st-century Swedish women writers